U-92,016-A is a psychoactive drug and research chemical used in scientific studies. It acts as a potent, high efficacy, and selective 5-HT1A receptor full agonist with a long duration of action. It has been suggested that it could be developed as an anxiolytic or antidepressant drug.

References 

Serotonin receptor agonists
Nitriles
Aminotetralins
Indoles